Hohneck may refer to:

Places 
 Hohneck, unincorporated community of Kansas, United States
 Hohneck (Vosges), mountain of the Vosges, France

People with the surname 
 Josh Hohneck, New Zealand rugby union player
 Sean Hohneck, New Zealand rugby union player